Jesse Jones McLarty (3 March 1920 – July 2001) was a Scottish professional footballer, who made appearances in the English football league with Wrexham. He also played for South Liverpool.

McLarty guested for Chester City during World War Two.

References

1920 births
2001 deaths
Wrexham A.F.C. players
South Liverpool F.C. players
Scottish footballers
Association football forwards
English Football League players
Chester City F.C. wartime guest players